The 2012 Liège–Bastogne–Liège was the 98th running of the Liège–Bastogne–Liège, a single-day cycling race. It was the thirteenth race of the 2012 UCI World Tour season.

The race was won by  rider Maxim Iglinsky after catching 's Vincenzo Nibali in the closing stages of the race after Nibali had attempted to win the race with a  attack. Defending race-winner Philippe Gilbert could only finish sixteenth in the race, almost 90 seconds down on Iglinsky.

Participating teams
As Liège–Bastogne–Liège was a UCI World Tour event, all 18 UCI ProTeams were invited automatically and obliged to send a squad. Seven other squads were given wildcard places into the race, and as such, formed the event's 25-team peloton.

The teams that were invited – wildcard teams denoted by * – were:

Results

References

External links
 Official website

2012 UCI World Tour
2012
2012 in Belgian sport